Mar del Sur is a town in Argentina.

Mar del Sur might also refer to:

 Pacific Ocean, or Mar del Sur
 South Seas, or Mar del Sur

See also
 South Sea (disambiguation)
 Southern Seas (disambiguation)
 Southern Ocean